Epilepsy Action is a British charity providing information, advice and support for people with epilepsy.

Activities 
Epilepsy Action provides freephone and email helplines and a wide range of information booklets, web pages and e-learning courses.  It has around 100 local support groups across England, Wales and Northern Ireland and a network of volunteers working in the community. It also organises conferences for people with epilepsy and health professionals with an interest in the condition.  It also has a website that includes information about epilepsy.

It undertakes and encourages non-laboratory research into epilepsy and the issues surrounding living with the condition.

Since 2008, the charity has organised the annual Bradford 10K athletics race which in 2019 attracted 3,000 runners.

Campaigns 
The charity has received international media coverage on a number of occasions due to its work in highlighting bad practice in online videos in relation to photosensitive epilepsy.

 In 2007, it claimed that 30 people had seizures as a result of a segment of animated footage commissioned by the organising committee of the London 2012 Summer Olympics to promote its logo.
 In 2011, Epilepsy Action highlighted issues with the video for the Kanye West song "All of the Lights". Tests of the video showed that it failed the flashing images guidelines set down by UK broadcasting watchdog Ofcom and so was likely to trigger a seizures in someone with photosensitive epilepsy.  A warning was placed on YouTube for people watching the video on its website.
 In 2015, it highlighted the presence of advertisements with flashing content that were posted on Vine by Twitter. The Advertising Standards Authority confirmed that Twitter were in breach of its guidelines.

References

External links
 Official website

Epilepsy organizations
Health charities in the United Kingdom
Organizations established in 1950
Charities based in West Yorkshire
Health in Yorkshire